Mount Cook Airline was a regional airline based in Christchurch, New Zealand. Formerly part of the Mount Cook Group and latterly a subsidiary of Air New Zealand, it operated scheduled services throughout the country under the Air New Zealand Link brand. In December 2019, the brand name was retired with all services operated under the Air New Zealand banner.

Early history

NZ Aero Transport
NZ Aero Transport Co. was established in 1920 at Timaru by Rodolph Wigley, who in 1906 had driven the first motor car to The Hermitage. Wigley leased five surplus Royal Air Force aircraft from the NZ Government for sightseeing. It was the first company of its kind in the country. The first aeroplane to land in Fairlie was war surplus Avro 504K biplane E4242 in May 1920, still carrying RAF roundels. Passenger and freight routes served areas between Wellington and Invercargill. In October 1920 with Captain JC Mercer, Wigley flew on the first one-day flight from Invercargill to Auckland. After a series of mishaps, such as damage during forced landings in paddocks, the company went into liquidation in 1923.

NZ Aero Transport Co fleet

Queenstown – Mount Cook Airways
In 1935, Wigley formed Queenstown - Mount Cook Airway in conjunction with his son Henry, who remained the managing director of the airline until 1979 and chairman until his death in 1980. The company operated charter flights around the Otago Lakes, Milford Sound and Mount Cook regions, until it was suspended by World War II.

Queenstown - Mount Cook Airways fleet

Postwar history
Flying resumed in 1952 using an Auster J1-A Autocrat, registration ZK-BDX (since preserved, formerly inside the terminal of Queenstown Airport now at the Mount Cook Hermitage Hotel Edmund Hillary Centre).

In 1954, NZ Aero Transport Company was reformed as Mount Cook Air Services Ltd, specialising in scenic flights, agricultural work and rescue missions. Henry Wigley solved the problem of landing in the Tasman, Fox and Franz Josef Glaciers by attaching retractable skis (designed and made in the company's vehicle workshop) to the Auster, and landed on the snow of Tasman Glacier. This is how the Ski Plane operation started, aimed at taking tourists to skifields and glaciers in ski-equipped light aircraft.

The Mount Cook Group operated bus services, trucking, skifields and built an airfield at Mount Cook to bring in the growing number of visitors to the Southern Alps. Scheduled services for Mount Cook Airline began on 6 November 1961 between Christchurch, Mount Cook, Cromwell and Te Anau with a 26-seater Douglas DC-3. At this stage Queenstown was not certified for DC-3 operations and passengers were bussed from Cromwell to Queenstown. On 1 November 1963 the service to Cromwell was extended to Dunedin on Mondays, Wednesdays and Fridays and from 3 November 1963 to Invercargill three days a week. The first scheduled flight into Queenstown was operated by DC-3 ZK-BKD on 4 February 1964.

The airline opened negotiations with NZ Tourist Air Travel, which operated air charter and air taxi services using amphibious aircraft, about the possibility of a merger. A bid was made and finally accepted on 31 December 1967 with the company becoming part of Mount Cook Airlines on 1 January 1968.

Mount Cook Airline was one of New Zealand's tourism pioneers opening up the tourist trail of Rotorua through to Christchurch, Mount Cook and Queenstown. For almost 30 years, it operated a fleet of Hawker Siddeley HS 748s across regional tourist routes in New Zealand. The first HS748 to arrive in NZ was ZK-CWJ. Its first flight was from Christchurch to Timaru and onto Oamaru on 25 October 1968. After a long evaluation study, the first of the new ATR 72-200s arrived in October 1995 as the chosen replacement of the HS 748s. They in turn were updated to the ATR 72-500 type in 2000

In June 2001, Air New Zealand Group added extra capacity on domestic routes by introducing four BAe 146s to supplement the ATRs. These aircraft were taken from the failed Qantas New Zealand franchise. A temporary measure, they retired the following year after six extra Boeing 737-300s were added to the mainline fleet.

Air New Zealand purchased part of the Mount Cook Group in the 1980s after Henry Wigley's death, increased to 30% on 5 December 1983, then another 47% in October 1985 after gaining approval on 18 July that year; and the remainder on 18 April 1991. On 9 December 2019, the airline was merged into the mainline Air New Zealand fleet and ceased to exist.

Mount Cook Airline had 378 employees (as at March 2007).

Destinations

Mount Cook Airline served the following routes in New Zealand at its closure:

Former destinations
Over the years Mount Cook Airline served many destinations throughout New Zealand, including:

Alexandra, Blenheim, Chatham Islands, Cromwell, Great Barrier Island, Greymouth, Hokitika, Kerikeri, Kaikohe, Kawau Island, Milford Sound, Mount Cook Village, Oamaru, Paihia, Stewart Island / Rakiura, Taupo, Te Anau, Timaru, Twizel, Waiheke Island, Wanaka and Westport.

Fleet
Mount Cook Airline currently operated ATR 72-500 and ATR 72-600 aircraft from main cities to larger provincial towns and also on some main trunk routes, complementing fellow subsidiary Air Nelson's smaller capacity Q-300 airliners.

The original ATR 72-200 fleet was swapped for the updated ATR 72-500 during 2001–2002. Extra aircraft were also added allowing Air New Zealand to retire the last of its Boeing 737-200s. In October 2011, Air New Zealand announced an increase of the ATR fleet by purchasing seven new ATR 72-600 models with five on option. Air New Zealand received the first of these 68-seat aircraft in October 2012, the rest following gradually through to 2016. Four purchase options were taken up in November 2014 when Air New Zealand announced the shutting down of Eagle Airways' flight operations and giving over route capacity to Mount Cook and Air Nelson  The ATR-600s were delayed for four years due to the economic conditions of the time. The -600 model is a further development of the type including a revised cabin layout and RNP navigation to allow flights into New Zealand's more marginal weather dependant airports such as Wellington, Queenstown, Rotorua and Hamilton.

Air New Zealand announced on 5 November 2015 that an order for an additional 15 ATR 72-600 aircraft, worth NZ$568 million, had been placed making Mount Cook Airlines the third-largest ATR fleet operator in the world with 29 ATR72-600 aircraft. Deliveries of the additional 15 -600 aircraft, started in late 2016 with the last aircraft delivered to Mount Cook Airline in 2019. Subsequent aircraft will now be delivered to parent company Air New Zealand. The new aircraft replaced the existing 11 ATR 72-500 aircraft. The additional ATR 72-600, are used on domestic regional services, supplementing existing ATR 72-500, -600 and Q300 aircraft.

The Mount Cook Airline fleet consisted of the following aircraft (as of August 2019):

Former fleet
From 6 November 1961, Mount Cook Airline operated three Douglas DC-3 aircraft operating until their final withdrawal on 16 May 1978. These aircraft were used to open up routes between Christchurch and Mount Cook, Cromwell and Te Anau/Manapouri. Passengers bound for Queenstown were initially bussed from Cromwell until DC-3 certification was obtained for Queenstown airport (although Cromwell was still used on demand, and as backup when Queenstown airport was unavailable due to weather). DC-3 aircraft were also used at various dates for services from Christchurch to Timaru and Oamaru, Queenstown to Alexandra and Dunedin and an extension from Te Anau to Invercargill.

A fleet of Hawker Siddeley HS-748s was operated from 1968 to 1996 operating into Mount Cook Airline's many tourist airports. The type operated scheduled services to the Chatham Islands from 1990 to 1992 after Safe Air withdrew flying operations. From 1992 to 1994, Air New Zealand chartered a 748 to operate the late evening off peak Invercargill - Christchurch route. The last commercial flight was on 9 February 1996, from Wellington to Christchurch. The HS 748 fleet was replaced by 7 ATR 72-200s from 1995 after an evaluation process that included the Fokker F50, BAE ATP, and Saab 2000.

On 2 December 1969, Mount Cook Airline introduced a de Havilland Canada DHC-6 Twin Otter (ZK-CJZ), intended for scenic flights from Queenstown to Milford Sound and scheduled flights from Queenstown to Te Anau/Manapouri and Queenstown to Alexandra and Dunedin. The Twin Otter wasn't an economic success and was cancelled from 24 September 1973. A second Twin Otter (ZK-MCO) was purchased in November 1983 for services between Auckland, Kerikeri and Rotorua as the HS 748 was too big for the loads on offer, but Mount Cook's Islander aircraft was too small. In 1988 this was transferred to Queenstown, to operate scenic flights from Queenstown to Milford Sound and scheduled flights from Queenstown to Te Anau/Manapouri. A third was purchased in 1995 but both were disposed of in 1998 when Mount Cook Airlines light aircraft business was sold.

Eight ex-Qantas New Zealand British Aerospace 146-300s were temporarily operated by Air New Zealand after Qantas New Zealand's collapse. They were used to boost extra capacity to domestic service from June 2001 to 2002. The BAe 146s were placed under Mount Cook Airline's management structure for the duration. (Up to 4 aircraft were operated at any one time as the BAe fleet were rotated through and sold off.) This allowed time for Air New Zealand to add another six Boeing 737-300s to the mainline fleet. The BAe 146s were then retired ending 12 years of domestic service in New Zealand.

Aircraft previously operated include:

Change in heavy maintenance
In April 2010, parent airline Air New Zealand announced that it was moving the ATR 72-500 and ATR 72-600 heavy maintenance work away from Mount Cook Airline's home of Christchurch Airport to Nelson. Air Nelson's maintenance base would take over all ATR 72-500/600 heavy maintenance work from November 2010.

Logo

The airline's symbol was the Mount Cook Lily which was displayed on the tails of its aeroplanes prior to the integration with the Air New Zealand link brand in the mid 1990s. At this stage, the flower was relegated to a spot just below the tail, before vanishing totally in the early 2000s. However, it made a return in 2012, appearing towards the front of Mount Cook's ATR 72-600 aircraft. The new logo was a much-simplified flower, featuring six separate petals rather than the former layered specimen.

Surviving aircraft
Most of Mount Cook Airline's ATR 72's are still in operation, either with Air New Zealand or sold off to other operators. Below is a list of other known aircraft that flew in Mount Cook colours.

See also
 List of defunct airlines of New Zealand
 History of aviation in New Zealand

References 

Defunct airlines of New Zealand
Airlines established in 1961
Airlines disestablished in 2019
Air New Zealand
Former seaplane operators
2019 disestablishments in New Zealand
Airlines established in 1920
New Zealand companies established in 1920
New Zealand companies established in 1961